Mary Ann Tobin is a former member of the Kentucky House of Representatives, serving from 1976 to 1984.  She served as Kentucky Auditor of Public Accounts from 1984 to 1988.  She is a member of the Democratic Party.

Early life and education
Mary Ann Tobin was born to Joseph Dalton Tobin Sr. and Mary Hulett (Broadbent) Tobin.  She had one brother, Joseph Dalton “Joe” Tobin, Jr., who was a regional businessman.

She graduated from the University of Kentucky with a Bachelor of Science degree in accounting.  While at UK, she was named the first Ms. Keeneland in 1963.  She was also a member of Chi Omega sorority and Beta Alpha Psi honor society.

Political career

Kentucky House of Representatives
In 1975 Tobin was elected to be a member of the Kentucky State House of Representatives from the 18th District which comprised Breckinridge and Meade counties.  She served in the House from 1976 to 1984.  In her first race she defeated two other Democrats in the primaries (Lynn Thompson and Wade Glasscock) before she defeated Republican Henry Gibson in the general election (4,287 to 2,915 votes).  In 1977, she defeated Keenan O'Connell in the primary election and faced no organized candidate in the general election.  In 1979 she ran unopposed in both the primary and general elections.  In 1981 she defeated F. Wayne Moore in the primaries but again faced no opposition in the general election.  While in the House she served as Chair of the Capital Construction Oversight Committee as well as worked to update the state’s judicial system, automobile title laws, and driver’s license plan.

Kentucky Auditor of Public Accounts
In 1983 she decided to campaign to be the Kentucky Auditor of Public Accounts.  In the Democratic Party primary she beat out Jerry Lundergan, Ed W. Hancock, Tom Ray, Logan Turner, and Doris Faye with 143.836 votes.  Lundergan was the second place finisher with 77,419 votes.

In the general election she defeated Republican Ronald B. Halleck with 503,954 votes to Halleck’s 280,331 votes.  She served in the position from 1984 until 1988.

As Auditor, she started a hotline to report fraud and established the Economy and Efficiency Audit Division as a way to try to stop waste in government.

Kentucky Senate campaign
She sat out of politics for several years but in 1992 she decided to run for the District 5 seat in the Kentucky State Senate.  She won the Democratic primary election which had seven candidates.  She lost the general election to Republican Virgil Moore by 2,590 votes.

2020 U.S. Senate campaign

Tobin filed paperwork to run in the Democratic primary in Kentucky's 2020 election for the U.S. Senate. Currently in the race, Tobin placed fourth behind Amy McGrath, Charles Booker, and Mike Broihier.

Business dealings
After leaving politics she focused on her family’s, and personal, businesses.  She is the current co-owner of Broadbent Wildlife Sanctuary in Meade County.  She is a part owner of First State Bank located in Irvington, a co-owner of Brandenburg Telephone company, and owns a 3,300 acre farm.

References

Businesspeople from Kentucky
Living people
Democratic Party members of the Kentucky House of Representatives
People from Meade County, Kentucky
State Auditors of Kentucky
University of Kentucky alumni
Women state legislators in Kentucky
Year of birth missing (living people)
Candidates in the 2020 United States Senate elections
21st-century American women politicians